Treasure is an action-adventure novel by Clive Cussler. This is the ninth book featuring the author's primary protagonist, Dirk Pitt.

Plot summary
The book starts with a historical prologue in which Julius Venator, a Roman, along with a group of Roman soldiers and slaves, sail in a fleet of ships ferrying the treasures from the Library of Alexandria before its destruction to a secret location to be buried in caverns. After the treasures are buried the people, the Roman soldiers, and slaves are all slaughtered by the natives. While one small ship manages to get away, they never reach land and the secret of the treasure is lost.

The story then shifts to the present day, where an envoy of the US President having a secret meeting with a would-be Aztec dictator, Topiltzin. Topiltzin kills the envoy, and sends his skin and heart back to the President.

Soon after, a Middle Eastern terrorist secretly hijacks a plane carrying Hala Kamil, the new United Nations Secretary-General. The hijacker bails out of the plane after ensuring that the plane crash lands in Greenland, where Dirk Pitt, Al Giordino, and Rudi Gunn are trying to locate a sunken Soviet submarine. Also in the area is Lily Sharp, who discovers an ancient coin. They rescue Hala from the plane wreck. As the plot unfolds, several more attempts are made on Hala's life, since she is trying to stop would-be dictator Akhmad Yazid from taking over Egypt. It is later revealed that both Topiltzin and Yazid are scions of a notorious crime family. Dirk is distracted by the promise of treasure, however. Locating a shipwreck in Greenland, they soon find a tablet detailing a mission to hide the treasure of the library at Alexandria. As Dirk, Al, and the Special Operations Forces rescue Hala Kamil from a hijacked ship in the Straits of Magellan, Hiram Yaeger locates the treasure — in Roma, Texas. The final stretch of the novel involves Dirk trying to hide the treasure from Yazid and his brother Topiltzin. Eventually, the treasure is discovered and Yazid, Topiltzin and their henchmen are killed.

Characters in Treasure

Dirk Pitt—Special Projects Director for the National Underwater and Marine Agency (NUMA)
Admiral James Sandecker—Chief Director of NUMA
Al Giordino—Assistant Special Projects Director for NUMA.
Rudi Gunn—Director of Logistics for NUMA.
Hala Kamil—UN Secretary General
Dr. Lily Sharp—researcher who finds Roman coin
Paul Capesterre—aka Akhmad Yazid, son of a criminal family and would-be dictator of Egypt
Robert Capesterre—aka Topiltzin (brother of Paul) would-be dictator of Mexico

Film, TV or theatrical adaptations

No film, television or theatrical adaptations have yet been produced from this novel.

Release Details

1988, United States, Simon & Schuster, 1988, Hardcover
1988, United States, Pocket Books, November 1988, Paperback.
1989, United States, Pocket Books Reissue, October 15, 1989, Paperback.
1991, United States, Simon & Schuster, May 1991, Hardcover.
2011, United States, Pocket Books, May 2011, Paperback.

1988 American novels
Dirk Pitt novels
Novels by Clive Cussler
American adventure novels
Simon & Schuster books
Books with cover art by Paul Bacon